Soviet invasion of Romania can refer to:
 Soviet occupation of Bessarabia and Northern Bukovina (1940)
 Battle of Romania (1944) and the subsequent Soviet occupation of Romania